The University Admission Rankings is a national ranking of Vietnamese high schools based on the average grades of the annual university entrance exam. The statistics is published by the Ministry of Education and Training.

2012 Ranking

(*) denotes a national public magnet high school.

2011 Ranking

(*) denotes a national public magnet high school.

References

High schools in Vietnam
High schools for the gifted in Vietnam
Schools in Vietnam